Sister Angelika is a 1932 Czech drama film directed by Martin Frič.

Cast
 Suzanne Marwille as Karla Richtrová-Sister Angelika, dancer
 Hugo Haas as Pavel Ryant
 Theodor Pistek as Prison's director
 Josef Rovenský
 Marta Trojanová
 Jan W. Speerger
 Josef Klapuch
 Robert Ford
 Frantisek V. Kucera
 Josef Sládek
 Sasa Razov

References

External links
 

1932 films
1932 drama films
1930s Czech-language films
Czechoslovak black-and-white films
Films directed by Martin Frič
Czechoslovak drama films
1930s Czech films